The second USS Mist (SP-567) was a United States Navy patrol vessel in commission from 1917 to 1919.

Mist was built as a private steam launch of the same name by the Herreshoff Manufacturing Company at Bristol, Rhode Island, in 1904. In April 1917, the U.S. Navy informally acquired her from her owner, Edward Morell, for use as a section patrol vessel during World War I. She was commissioned as USS Mist (SP-567) on 28 April 1917. Formal acquisition of Mist from Morrell followed on 12 May 1917.

Assigned to the 1st Naval District in northern New England, Mist served for the rest of World War I as a dispatch boat and guard boat in the vicinity of Boston, Massachusetts. She also supported the minesweeping training activities of the Mine Sweeping Division, which operated along the coast of Massachusetts from its base at Boston Harbor.

Mist was returned to Morrell on 3 February 1919.

References

Department of the Navy Naval History and Heritage Command Online Library of Selected Images: Civilian Ships: Mist (Steam Launch, 1904). Served as USS Mist (SP-567) in 1917-1919
NavSource Online: Section Patrol Craft Photo Archive: Mist (SP 567)

Patrol vessels of the United States Navy
World War I patrol vessels of the United States
Ships built in Bristol, Rhode Island
1904 ships